Friedrich Benjamin Osiander (9 February 1759, Zell unter Aichelberg – 25 May 1822, Göttingen) was an obstetrician at Göttingen, who invented uterine traction forceps. He was the father of obstetrician Johann Friedrich Osiander.

He studied medicine at the University of Tübingen, and following graduation (1779), settled as a general practitioner in Kirchheim unter Teck. In 1792 he became an associate professor of obstetrics at the University of Göttingen.

Principal works 
 Lehrbuch der Hebammenkunst : sowohl zum Unterricht angehender Hebammen als zum Lesebuch für jede Mutter, 1796 - Textbook of midwifery.
 Neue Denkwürdigkeiten für Aerzte und Geburtshelfer, 1797 - New memorandum for physicians and obstetricians.
 Handbuch der Entbindungskunst, 1818 - Handbook of obstetrics.

References
  Early American Manual Therapy, accessed 30 May 2008)

1759 births
1822 deaths
German medical researchers
Academic staff of the University of Göttingen
University of Tübingen alumni
People from Göppingen (district)